Acanthodactylus aegyptius is a species of lizard in the family Lacertidae. The species is endemic to the Middle East.

Etymology
The specific name, aegyptius, refers to Egypt, where the holotype was collected.

Geographic range
A. aegyptius is found in eastern Egypt, Israel, and northern Sinai.

Reproduction
A. aegyptius is oviparous.

References

Further reading
Baha El Din, Sherif M. (2007). "A new lizard of the Acanthodactylus scutellatus group (Squamata: Lacertidae) from Egypt". Zoology in the Middle East 40: 21–32. (Acanthodactylus aegyptius, new species).

Acanthodactylus
Reptiles described in 2007
Taxa named by Sherif M. Baha El Din